Joy Whitlock (born August 13, 1980) is a Christian musician and songwriter who performs Contemporary Christian music.

Biography
Whitlock grew up primarily in Mississippi. She was the daughter of a pastor, but says her interest in Christianity emerged only after seeing The Passion of the Christ as a teenager. She moved to Memphis at the age of 17, where she attracted the attention of Ardent Studios, who released her debut record.

Recordings

She released The Fake EP in 2005, and one full-length album, God and a Girl, released September 16, 2008. Both were released on Ardent. Her full-length album was received positively by reviewers, and she was compared to artists like Jennifer Knapp and Kendall Payne.

Discography
 The Fake EP (2005)(Ardent/INO)
 God and a Girl (2008)(Ardent/INO)

References

Living people
1980 births
American performers of Christian music
American singer-songwriters
Fair Trade Services artists
21st-century American singers